William Charles Wertz (born January 15, 1967) is an American former Major League Baseball player. A pitcher, Wertz played for the Cleveland Indians in 1993 and 1994. He played college baseball at Ohio State University. He last played professional baseball in 1997 with the minor league Akron Aeros.

External links
, or Venezuela Winter League

1967 births
Living people
Akron Aeros players
Baseball players from Cleveland
Buffalo Bisons (minor league) players
Canton-Akron Indians players
Charlotte Knights players
Cleveland Indians players
Columbus Indians players
Gulf Coast Indians players
Leones del Caracas players
American expatriate baseball players in Venezuela
Major League Baseball pitchers
Ohio State Buckeyes baseball players
Ohio State University alumni
Pawtucket Red Sox players
Port City Roosters players
Reno Silver Sox players
Tacoma Rainiers players
Watertown Indians players